Elaeagnus angustifolia, commonly called Russian olive, silver berry, oleaster, or wild olive, is a species of Elaeagnus, native to western and central Asia, Iran, from southern Russia and Kazakhstan to Turkey, parts of Pakistan and parts of India. , it is widely established in North America as an introduced species.

Description 
Its stems, buds, and leaves have a dense covering of silvery to rusty scales. The plants begin to flower and fruit from 3 years old. The fruits are about 1 cm wide and sweet, though with a dryish, mealy texture.

The species is established and reproduced primarily by seed, with some vegetative propagation also occurring.

Taxonomy 
The species was described as Zizyphus cappadocica by John Gerard, and was grown by John Parkinson by 1633. Its common name comes from its similarity in appearance to the olive (Olea europaea), in a different botanical family, the Oleaceae.

Ecology 

The shrub can fix nitrogen in its roots, enabling it to grow on bare mineral substrates.

The caterpillars of the high altitude alpine moth Lachana alpherakii use it as a host plant. The fruit is readily eaten and the seeds disseminated by many species of birds.

Invasive behavior 
The species was introduced into North America by the late 19th century, and was both planted and spread through the consumption of its fruits (which seldom ripen in England), by birds, which disperse the seeds. Russian olive is considered to be an invasive species in many places in the United States because it thrives on poor soil, has high seedling survival rates, matures in a few years, and out-competes the native vegetation. It often invades riparian habitats where the canopy of cottonwood trees has died. Its quick-spreading root system can make it pest-like.

Uses 

It is widely grown across southern and central Europe as a drought and cold-resistant ornamental plant for its scented flowers, edible fruit, attractive yellow foliage and black bark.

In Iran, the dried powder of the fruit is used mixed with milk for rheumatoid arthritis and joint pains. There is evidence supporting beneficial effects of aqueous extract of Persian olive in reducing the symptoms of osteoarthritis with an efficacy comparable to that of acetaminophen and ibuprofen.

It is one of the seven items used in Haft-sin, a traditional table setting of Nowruz, the traditional Persian spring celebration. The dried fruit, known locally as senjed, is one of seven served in its own syrup in a fruit salad called haft mēwa eaten during Nowruz in Afghanistan.

References

External links 

Jepson Manual Treatment
Species Profile – Russian Olive (Elaeagnus angustifolia), National Invasive Species Information Center, United States National Agricultural Library Lists general information and resources for Russian olive
USDA Plants Profile
Photo gallery

angustifolia
Flora of Western Asia
Flora of Central Asia
Flora of Eastern Europe
Plants described in 1753
Taxa named by Carl Linnaeus